Joseph Martin Luther Gardner (January 15, 1970 – December 5, 2008) was an American fugitive and convicted criminal who was executed in South Carolina for murder. Gardner was one of several men who kidnapped and raped 25-year-old Melissa McLauchlin on December 30, 1992. McLauchlin was then fatally shot five times by Gardner before her body was dumped on the side of a road. After the murder, Gardner fled the state and remained a fugitive for nearly two years. He was added to the FBI Ten Most Wanted Fugitives list on May 25, 1994, and was captured in Philadelphia, Pennsylvania, on October 19, 1994.

Murder
On December 30, 1992, an intoxicated 25-year-old Melissa McLauchlin locked herself out of her house in North Charleston, South Carolina. As she crossed the street towards a grocery store, she was picked up by Gardner and two other men; Matthew Carl Mack and Matthew Paul Williams. The three men kidnapped McLauchlin and took her back to a mobile home where she was raped repeatedly and assaulted. McLauchlin was then bound with a blindfold, handcuffed, and placed on the floor inside a car.

As the men drove along a highway, McLauchlin broke free from the handcuffs and tried to escape. Gardner then pushed her head back and shot her twice in the face. He then dumped her body along a highway in Dorchester County where he shot her another three times, killing her.

The murder was racially motivated, with Gardner making a New Year's Resolution to kill a white woman, after watching news footage of the acquittal of police officers for the beating of Rodney King. The group planned to kill a white woman as revenge for "400 years of oppression", including slavery. Notes were found explaining the motive.

Aftermath
All three men fled the state after the crime. Mack and Williams were arrested in January 1993, but Gardner remained a fugitive for nearly two years. He was added to the FBI Ten Most Wanted Fugitives list on May 25, 1994. He was captured in Philadelphia, Pennsylvania, on October 19, 1994, and taken back to South Carolina to face trial. Gardner was the 437th fugitive to be placed on the FBI's Ten Most Wanted fugitives list and spent nearly five months on the list before being captured.

Mack and Williams were sentenced to life in prison, while two other men who participated in the rape of McLauchlin each received less than ten years in jail as part of a plea deal. Gardner was the only person involved in the crime to receive a death sentence, as he was the one who had killed McLauchlin.

Execution
Gardner was executed on December 5, 2008, via lethal injection at Broad River Correctional Institution in Columbia, South Carolina. He declined to make a final statement.

See also
 Capital punishment in South Carolina
 Capital punishment in the United States
 FBI Ten Most Wanted Fugitives, 1990s
 List of people executed in South Carolina
 List of people executed in the United States in 2008

References

1970 births
2008 deaths
1992 murders in the United States
20th-century American criminals
21st-century executions by South Carolina
21st-century executions of American people
American male criminals
Criminals from Michigan
American people executed for murder
American people convicted of kidnapping
Executed African-American people
Executed people from Michigan
Fugitives
People convicted of murder by South Carolina
People executed by South Carolina by lethal injection
People from Detroit
Racially motivated violence against European Americans
20th-century African-American people
21st-century African-American people